The 2013 Turkmenistan Higher League (Ýokary Liga) season was the 21st season of Turkmenistan's professional football league. It began on 12 April 2013 with the first round of games and ended in November 2013.

Teams

League table

Results

First half of season

Second half of season

Top goal-scorers
The top scorers are: Updated to end of season.

Scoring
First goalscorer: 
Döwlet Ataýew for Ahal against Talyp Sporty, 11th minute (12 April 2013)
First hat-trick: 
Mämmedaly Garadanow for FC Balkan against FC Ahal (23 April 2013)

External links
 Season at soccerway.com
 Official news agency site 

Ýokary Liga seasons
Turk
Turk
1